Matthew J. Baek (born 25 November 1971) is a Korean-American illustrator, children's book author, and graphic designer working as a government contractor for USAID. His illustrations have appeared in many publications, both nationally and internationally, including the Washington Post, USA Weekend magazine, Forbes magazine, etc.

Children's books
 In God's Hands, 2005–2006 Booklist Top Ten Books for Youth
 Be Gentle with the Dog, Dear, 2008–2008 Borders Original Voices Selection
 Panda and Polar Bear, 2009 – Junior Library Guild Selection
 N is for North Korea, 2012 – 
 Poonya the Red Panda, 2015
 Pinecone's First Snow, 2015
 I Am a Cat, 2016
 Long Eared Bunny, 2016

Illustration
Represented by Donna Rosen, Matthew J. Baek has been illustrating nationally and internationally since 1996. His clients include Wall Street Journal, the Washington Post, USA Weekend magazine, AARP, Forbes magazine, the Discipleship Journal, Samsung, etc.

Graphic Design
 Working as a Senior Graphic Designer creating PEPFAR logo, Faith-Based Initiatives brochure, and products for USAID.

References

External links
Korea Daily
Donna Rosen Artists: Portfolio
http://pdf.dec.org/pdf_docs/PNACU960.pdf
Korean Graphic Design

American children's writers
South Korean emigrants to the United States
1971 births
Living people
American illustrators
American writers of Korean descent